The common name elfin saddle is given to a number of Ascomycete fungi in the order Pezizales.  These medium to small fungi often have irregular saddle-shaped caps.  Species include:

Gyromitra infula (elfin saddle)
Helvella lacunosa (fluted black elfin saddle)
Helvella elastica (brown elfin saddle)
Helvella crispa (elfin saddle)

Pezizales
Fungus common names